Sing You is the fourth mini-album from Japanese singer Emi Tawata but the first under the label Sony Music Entertainment. It is the first release after 2 years. There are 2 different version available: A limited CD+DVD version and a CD-only version. In the music video of "Ne", Japanese actress Satomi Ishihara, who was part of the Romeo&Juliet play in Japan 2012, plays the lead role. In the chorus of the third song on the album, "Namida ga Deta", Japanese singer-songwriter Hanah supports the background vocals.

Track list

References

2012 EPs